The William Burnett House was a historic farmhouse located near the city of Washington Court House in Fayette County, Ohio, United States.  Constructed in the nineteenth century, it was once a masterpiece of multiple architectural styles, and it was designated a historic site because of its architectural distinction.

Burnett
William Burnett was a prominent Union Township resident in the middle of the 19th century: an 1850 publication recorded him as serving as a constable for the township and as a marshal for the village of Washington Court House.  Six years later, he was elected to a five-year term as the county sheriff for Fayette County.  In addition to his law enforcement duties, Burnett operated a farm on the Leesburg Road southwest of Washington Courthouse; here he built a new house in 1869.

Architecture
Burnett's house was built with brick walls and foundation, a metal roof, and elements of wood.  Five bays wide, it featured an unusual combination of architectural styles: the basic floor plan was that of an I-house, but unlike most I-houses, it was constructed with high-style features common to the Greek Revival and Italianate styles of architecture.  Some of the most prominent components of the house's design were the pairs of brackets placed above the hooded windows to support the large cornice; these Italianate elements were supplemented by Greek pieces such as the glass around the main entrance, which featured a lintel, sidelights, and a transom light.  Together, the Greek and Italianate elements served to distinguish Burnett's residence from the typical I-house, which was a thoroughly vernacular structure.

Preservation
In early 1989, the Burnett House was listed on the National Register of Historic Places, qualifying because of its historically significant architecture.  Despite this designation, the house was destroyed by 2006, but it remains listed on the Register.

References

Houses completed in 1869
Buildings and structures in Fayette County, Ohio
Greek Revival houses in Ohio
I-houses in Ohio
Italianate architecture in Ohio
National Register of Historic Places in Fayette County, Ohio
U.S. Route 62
1869 establishments in Ohio
2006 disestablishments in Ohio
Buildings and structures demolished in 2006